The American Manual Alphabet (AMA) is a manual alphabet that augments the vocabulary of American Sign Language.

Letters and digits
The letters and digits are signed as follows. In informal contexts, the handshapes are not made as distinctly as they are in formal contexts.

The manual alphabet can be used on either hand, normally the signer's dominant hand – that is, the right hand for right-handers, the left hand for left-handers. Most frequently, the manual alphabet is signed just below the dominant shoulder of the signer. When used within other signs or in a context in which this is not plausible, this general rule can be disregarded.

J and Z involve motion. J is I with a twist of the wrist, so that the little finger traces the curve of the printed form of the letter; Z is an index finger moved back and forth, so that the finger traces the zig-zag shape of the letter Z. Both of these "tracings" are made as seen by the signer if right-handed, as shown by the illustrations in this article. When signed with the left hand, the motions are in mirror image, therefore unreversed for the viewer. However, fluent signers do not need to "read" the shapes of these movements.

In most drawings or illustrations of the American Manual Alphabet, some of the letters are depicted from the side to better illustrate the desired hand shape. For example, the letters G and H are frequently shown from the side to illustrate the position of the fingers. However, they are signed with the hand in an ergonomically neutral position, palm facing to the side and fingers pointing forward.

Several letters have the same hand shape, and are distinguished by orientation. These are "h" and "u", "k" and "p" (thumb on the middle finger), "g" and "q" and, in informal contexts, "d" and "g/q". In rapid signing, "n" is distinguished from "h/u" by orientation. The letters "a" and "s" have the same orientation, and are very similar in form. The thumb is on the side of the fist in the letter "a", and in front for "s".  When used within fingerspelled English words, letters of the manual alphabet may be oriented differently than if they were to stand alone.

Rhythm, speed and movement
When fingerspelling, the hand is at shoulder height; it does not bounce with each letter. A double letter within a word is signed in different ways, through a bounce of your hand, a slide of your hand, or repeating the sign of a letter. Letters are signed at a constant speed; a pause functions as a word divider. The first letter may be held for the length of a letter extra as a cue that the signer is about to start fingerspelling.

Uses 
Fingerspelling is primarily used for borrowing words from English. It is typically only used in a specific set of circumstances. The following are words that might need to be fingerspelled: proper names, brand names, place names, and all other words that do not have a conventional sign. In other instances, use fingerspelling sparingly.

Changes and variations in the manual alphabet 
Like other languages, American Sign Language is constantly evolving. While changes in fingerspelling are less likely, slight changes still occur over time. The manual alphabet looks differently today than it did merely decades ago. A prime example of this pattern of change is found in the "screaming 'E'". Older generations of deaf individuals still insist that the "E" handshape requires that the thumb make contact with the tips of the index and middle fingers. Meanwhile, younger generations are beginning to produce a handshape that separates the thumb from the other fingers on the lower end of the palm.

English and the manual alphabet 
Since fingerspelling was originally developed in order to incorporate the English language into sign language, it is very closely linked to English. Studies have shown that deaf individuals process reading and fingerspelling similarly. As a result, fingerspelling has had a profound impact on the literacy of deaf and hard of hearing children. This conclusion is widely accepted, but the debate lies in which methods of teaching best utilize this relationship.

Gallery

References

External links
 Practice fingerspelling receptive in real life Practice "reading" fingerspelling using real life videos.
 Fingerspell A free, online practice site with realistic, animated ASL fingerspelling.
 ASL Fingerspelling Resource Site Free online fingerspelling lessons, quizzes, and activities.
 ASL Fingerspelling Online Advanced Practice Tool Test and improve your receptive fingerspelling skills using this free online resource.
 Fingerspelling Beginner's Learning Tool Learn the basic handshapes of the fingerspelled alphabet.
 Manual Alphabet and Fingerspelling  Further information, fingerspelling Tips and video example of ASL Alphabet.

American Sign Language
Manual alphabet